The Mark is a residential apartment complex located in Central Park, a redevelopment site located adjacent to Broadway in , in the City of Sydney local government area of New South Wales, Australia. The building comprises two building groups: Mark One and Mark Two. Mark One is level 1-19, which primarily one and two bedroom floor plans. Mark Two is level 20–27, with two and three bedroom apartment units.

Description
The Mark is located south of the Sydney central business district, in the Central Park development, which comprises residential, retail and commercial. Central Park was jointly developed by Frasers Property and Sekisui House Australia and was designed by Johnson Pilton Walker. The development was contracted to Watpac.

The entire Central Park project site covered  on Broadway. It is a redeveloped industrial site, with boundaries at O'Connor Street, Carlton Street, Broadway and Chippendale Way. The building was one of the stage two development of Central Park, which was started in September 2011 and was completed in August 2014.

Features
 The deck on the rooftop with spa, lawn and terrace spaces.
 The lounge room with wireless internet provision and a reading room.
 A pocket park
 Each apartment unit has a loggia, which can be opened to the natural ventilation and sunlight by fingertip-controlled sliding glass panels.

Sustainability features

 Establishment of a sustainability team which consisted of experienced consultants and committed subcontractors.
 An on-site trigeneration plant to reduce carbon emissions.
 A recycled water treatment plant (blackwater system to minimise the demand of main water. The water is collected from rainwater at roof, storm water, groundwater, sewage from adjacent public sewer and building within the development, backwash from pools and spas in the development, and irrigation water from green walls. The recycled water is used for toilet flushing, irrigation, washing machines and mechanical plant.
 Sub-meters and smart metre panels are provided in each apartment.
 Use of environment-friendly materials throughout the project.
 Use of highest available water and energy rated appliances to every apartment.
 Series of training sessions were provided to staffs, client and project's subcontractors.

Awards
 Winner of High-Density Development category of UDIA NSW 2015 Awards (NSW).
 Shortlisted in Design and Innovation category of UDIA NSW 2015 Awards (NSW).

Heritage

The site formally was Carlton & United Breweries site in Chippendale. Heritage consultants Godden Mackay Logan was engaged to undertake the comprehensive site survey, analysis, archaeological investigation and documentation. Urbis, who is heritage architect was engaged to adaptively reuse of heritage structures in collaboration with the project architects. In the end, there are 33 items were identified as heritage items and have been retained. The heritage items including the tiled arch at Kent Road, terraces and warehouses along Kensington Street, three hotels, the brewery yard buildings and brick stack and the administration building will be restored or adaptively reused.

See also

 Architecture of Sydney

References

External links

Apartment buildings in Sydney
Residential buildings completed in 2014
2014 establishments in Australia
Chippendale, New South Wales